Neil S. Hirsch (June 7, 1947 – June 24, 2021) was an American businessman and entrepreneur. In 1969, he founded Telerate, a global communications network. In addition, he was the owner of Loanet and the patron of the BlackWatch Polo Team.

Early life

Neil Samuel Hirsch was born on June 7, 1947 in St. Louis. His father, Harold Hirsch, was a New York-based executive for the Midwest department store chain P. N. Hirsch. Months after his birth, Hirsch's family moved to Rockville Centre, New York.

Career
At the age of 21, Hirsch dropped out of the University of Bridgeport and founded Telerate, a global communications network, where he served as president and chief executive. In 1990, the company was sold to Dow Jones & Company for over $1.5 billion. 

He later founded Loanet, a securities-tracking firm, and served as its chairman.

In 1999, Hirsch purchased the Player's Club Restaurant in Wellington, Florida, which is where he met his wife, Laura DeLuca M.D.

In his later years, Hirsch and longtime business partner Steven Rappaport, with whom he founded RZ Capital, purchased Backstage magazine and Sonicbids in December of 2013. RZ Capital sold its share of the company in 2018.

Polo
In 1995, Hirsch co-founded the Bridgehampton Polo Club with his childhood friend Peter M. Brant. He served as its President for many years. In 2011, he sold his share to Peter Brant.

Hirsch also owned the BlackWatch Polo Team, which was sponsored by Ralph Lauren.

Personal life

Hirsch was married briefly to Cynthia Duncan, step-granddaughter of the notable organized crime figure Meyer Lansky. In 1973, he married Caroline Hirsch, owner of Carolines on Broadway, a New York comedy club the two purchased together in 1981. They were divorced in 1986.

References

External links
Official website

1947 births
2021 deaths
American businesspeople
American racehorse owners and breeders
Businesspeople from St. Louis